Hassan Joharchi (28 July 1968 – 3 February 2017) was an Iranian actor. He started his career by playing in the movie Elephant in the Darkness in 1988, and subsequently became famous for playing in Collapse directed by Sirus Alvand in 1991.

Early life
Joharchi was born in Tehran. His father(Hamid joharchi) was from Ardebil.

Death
Joharchi died on 3 February 2017 in Shahid Chamran Hospital, Tehran. He was suffering from hepatitis.

Selected filmography

Films
Two Women
The Feast
Blue
Saga of Heroes

TV series
Flying Passion 2012
Heights Underneath , seven-episode teleplay, channel 4 Actor, director: Mohsen Moeini 2016
White Nights
Factor 8
She Was an Angel (Once an angel)
Youthful Days 1999-2000
Kimia
Loneliness of Leila
Distances

References

External links

1968 births
2017 deaths
Iranian male television actors
Iranian male actors
Male actors from Tehran
Deaths from hepatitis
Infectious disease deaths in Iran
20th-century Iranian male actors
21st-century Iranian male actors